Abe Elkinson (born 13 June 1969) is a business man who lives in Manchester, England. He was born in Dublin, Ireland. One of five children whose father died of heart attack when Abe was 15, this loss was to be the catalyst behind Abe's company Trust Medical. 

Real Business Magazine cited Trust Medical as one of 50 UK companies that are 'The Cream of British Startups'. Through his own personal experience, Elkinson is determined that Trust Medical will assist in preventing out of hospital deaths due to heart attack and workplace accidents. To help deliver his message, Elkinson teamed up with presenter and GP Mark Porter and Journalist and broadcaster Michael Buerk. He has associations with the British Cardiac Patients Association, the Ambulance Service and Philips Medical Systems. Trust Medical is the UK's first company to specialise in providing resuscitation equipment, first aid training and occupational health services to UK organisations.
Trust Medical closed their doors on the 29th January 2017 and liquidated their assets.

Elkinson is a director of Elkinson and Jones, a company that provides advice to SME's (Small to Medium Sized Enterprises) seeking corporate finance, business planning and structuring.

References

1969 births
Living people
Businesspeople from Dublin (city)
Philanthropists from Dublin (city)